Pierfrancesco Majorino (born 14 May 1973) is an Italian politician and Member of the European Parliament.

He served as assessor of social policies of Milan during Giuliano Pisapia's term as mayor, from 2011 to 2016, as well as during the first mayoral term of Giuseppe Sala, from 2016 until his election as MEP in 2019.

In 2019 he has been elected as a Member of the European Parliament. He has since been serving on the Committee on Development. In 2020, he also joined the Special Committee on Foreign Interference in all Democratic Processes in the European Union.

In addition to his committee assignments, Majorino is part of the Parliament's delegations to the EU-Turkey Joint Parliamentary Committee and to the Parliamentary Assembly of the Union for the Mediterranean. He is also a member of the European Parliament Intergroup on Anti-Racism and Diversity, the European Parliament Intergroup on Fighting against Poverty, the European Parliament Intergroup on Trade Unions and the URBAN Intergroup.

He is a candidate for regional president in the 2023 Lombard regional election with the support of centre-left Democratic Party and the Five Star Movement.

References

Living people
1973 births
MEPs for Italy 2019–2024
Democratic Party (Italy) MEPs
Democratic Party (Italy) politicians